Parul University is a private university in Vadodara, Gujarat, India. It was established in 2009 as the Parul Group of Institutes, and was given university status in 2015.

Recognition

Parul University is recognized by University Grants Commission, the National Assessment and Accreditation Council and the National Board of Accreditation, an autonomous body of All India Council for Technical Education (AICTE).

Controversy 

Jayesh, founder President of the University, was accused of harassing a student. The female rector of the girls' hostel, was arrested and charged with helping to facilitate the crime  He was apprehended on 21 June 2016 by Vadodara police and arrested.

As of January 2018, Jayesh was denied bail by the court and remains in judicial custody.

References

Private universities in India
Universities in Gujarat
Universities and colleges in Vadodara
Educational institutions established in 2009
2009 establishments in Gujarat